Borderlands Legends is a third-person shooter developed by Gearbox Software and published by 2K Games for iOS. It was released in 2012 to coincide with the release of Borderlands 2.

Reception

The game received "mixed" reviews according to the review aggregation website Metacritic. IGN said that the game was "a good idea dragged down by its inconsistent execution and lack of content."

References

External links
 

2012 video games
2K games
Borderlands (series) games
Gearbox Software games
IOS games
IOS-only games
Third-person shooters
Video games developed in the United States